Literary property is a term used in publishing to refer to works generally covered by copyright but also an associated set of property rights that go far beyond what courts have historically permitted to be claimed as copyright infringement.

The Writers Guild of America, for instance, uses this term exclusively to refer to works registered with its WGA script registration service, so as not to restrict the claims it or its users can make regarding their rights.

Narrower than "intellectual property"
Since it applies only to literary works and not technological or social constructs such as are covered by patent or trademark law, the term is much narrower in scope than the hotly contested term "intellectual property" sometimes used to refer to all non-physical works in which property rights are recognized.

Differences between literary property and other non-physical property
Among other differences, in literary works a very specific concept of attribution is a critical part of the work itself - works tend to become markedly less valued or more valued based upon who originated or created it, which is simply not the case for inventions or brand names.  Also, most countries recognize moral rights that are not alienable from the work, that is, a purchaser of rights in the work does not have the right to relabel it as if someone else had written it.  While the USA does not recognize moral rights, it does have complex de facto standards such as the WGA screenwriting credit system which are actually more demanding and rigorous in specific industries.

Copyright law
Intellectual property law